Poster Boy might refer to:

Poster Boy (street artist), the pseudonym of a famous graffiti artist active in New York City
Poster Boy (film), a 2004, gay-themed film